11th dimension may refer to:

Supergravity, a field theory that combines the principles of supersymmetry and general relativity.
11-dimensional spacetime, which appears in M-theory, a proposed "master theory" that unifies the five superstring theories
Introduction to M-theory
"11th Dimension" (song), by Julian Casablancas, 2009

See also
Superstring theory
'Pataphysics